Vignola is a railway station serving Vignola, in the region of Emilia-Romagna, northern Italy.

It is the terminus of the Casalecchio–Vignola railway and of Line S2A of Bologna metropolitan railway service.

Train services are operated by Trenitalia Tper.

The station is currently managed by Ferrovie Emilia Romagna (FER).

History 
The station was inaugurated on 28 October 1938, together with the resto the railway line.

Passenger transport was suspended on the whole line in 1967, while freight transport was suspended in 1995. The station was reactivated on 19 September 2004.

Features
The station consists of three tracks.

Train services

The station is served by the following service(s):

 Suburban services (Treno suburbano) on line S2A, Bologna - Vignola

See also

 List of railway stations in Emilia-Romagna
 Bologna metropolitan railway service

References 

Railway stations in Emilia-Romagna
Railway stations opened in 1938